Mark Thomas McCloskey is an American former personal injury lawyer practicing in St. Louis, Missouri, who attracted national attention in 2020 after he and his wife Patricia brandished firearms at protestors who walked past their house on a private street.

The couple was charged with unlawful use of a weapon, a class E felony; they bargained down and pleaded guilty to misdemeanors and were subsequently pardoned by Missouri Governor Mike Parson. In February 2022, McCloskey's law license was suspended indefinitely, but the suspension was stayed while he serves one year of probation.

In 2022, McCloskey ran for a United States Senate seat in Missouri, but he lost the Republican primary to Eric Schmitt.

Early life and education 
McCloskey was born in Saint Louis and attended St. Louis Country Day School, graduating in 1975.

He earned his A.B. in Sociology from Southern Methodist University in 1982, and his Juris Doctor from Southern Methodist's Dedman School of Law in 1985.

Career
McCloskey was admitted to the bar in 1986 in Texas; in 1986, Missouri; in 1986, Nebraska; U.S. District Court, Southern District of Illinois, U.S. District Court, Eastern District of Missouri and to the U.S. Court of Appeals, 7th and 8th Circuits; and 1987, in Illinois. His practice has focused on suits involving traumatic brain injuries, spinal cord injuries, birth injuries, orthopedic injuries and major injuries resulting from car wrecks.

The couple have spent "decades suing their neighbors and family members to protect their property," The Atlantic reported in 2020. They asserted "squatter's rights" on a slice of shared property in their subdivision. They razed beehives used for educational purposes by the synagogue next door, then threatened to sue if the congregation didn't remove the resultant debris. They sued a dog breeder from whom they bought a German shepherd.

Confrontation with marchers

On June 28, 2020, a group of Black Lives Matter protesters entered the private Portland Place neighborhood, intending to join a larger body of 500 marchers at the home of St. Louis Mayor Lyda Krewson. (They were protesting Krewson, who publicly read the names and addresses of locals who had written to demand defunding of the St. Louis Metropolitan Police Department.)  Livestreamed video showed protesters entering the community by walking through an intact gate that a man was holding open. Twenty seconds later, the video shows Mark McCloskey with a rifle outside his house, yelling at protesters. McCloskey later told media that the protesters "smashed through the historic wrought iron gates of Portland Place, destroying them, rushed towards my home...put us in fear for our lives", and also that "the gate came down and a large crowd of angry, aggressive people poured through. I was terrified that we’d be murdered within seconds". While the gate was damaged at some point in time, it was unclear who had damaged it.

As the crowd approached, Mark and Patricia stood outside their front door with a semi-automatic AR-15 and handgun respectively. McCloskey shouted "private property" and "get out" multiple times. Several protesters confronted the two in front of their home, exchanging heated words only several yards apart. Some protesters were heard asking others to leave and move on, while other protesters were heard threatening the McCloskeys. No shots were fired and there were no injuries. Shortly after the incident, the McCloskeys told reporters that they support the Black Lives Matter movement and civil rights.

There was no evidence that the protesters had weapons, a prosecutor said in 2021. Mark McCloskey in July 2020 had told media that the "people in the crowd in front of my house" were "armed with guns" and that "the police were aware and have video" of that. He said, "We saw the weapons at the time", and accused one protester of showing loaded magazines and telling him: "You're next".

As a result of their newfound fame, the next month the couple were invited to speak at the 2020 Republican National Convention. In their remarks, which they delivered via video from their home, Mark McCloskey said, "It seems as if the Democrats no longer view the government's job as protecting honest citizens from criminals, but rather protecting criminals from honest citizens."

The couple pleaded their felonies down to misdemeanors and were fined a combined $3,000. Republican Missouri Governor Mike Parson subsequently issued pardons for the pair.

In February 2022, the Missouri Supreme Court suspended McCloskey's law license indefinitely but stayed that suspension and imposed one year of probation. On June 6, the United States Supreme Court declined to hear McCloskey's appeal.

Political activities
McCloskey has donated to both Republican and Democratic candidates. He gave $500 to former Sen. Claire McCaskill, who defeated Todd Akin in 2012. He gave $1,000 to Republican Bill Phelps, who was defeated by incumbent Democratic congressman Ike Skelton in 1992.

Campaign for U.S. Senate 

In 2020, McCloskey launched a campaign for the U.S. Senate seat being vacated by Roy Blunt.

At a candidate's forum in Osage Beach, Missouri, in October 2021, McCloskey stated that he believes rape and incest victims as young as 13 years old should be prohibited from obtaining abortions. He said he once represented a woman who was raped by an uncle at 13, had the child, and later obtained a master's degree; and that the child who would have been aborted ended up getting a master's degree as well. McCloskey said that it had bothered him "as long ago as when I was in grade school" that some death penalty opponents also support abortion rights. He added, "The justices of the Supreme Court in the most heinous crimes don't have the right to decide who should live and die, but every 13-year-old girl on the street should be able to decide the fate of the life of their child?"

On August 2, 2022, McCloskey lost the Republican primary to Eric Schmitt.

References

2020 controversies in the United States
2020 in Missouri
20th-century American lawyers
21st-century American lawyers
Candidates in the 2022 United States Senate elections
Crime in St. Louis
Dedman School of Law alumni
Incidents during the George Floyd protests
Lawyers from St. Louis
Living people
Missouri Republicans
Southern Methodist University alumni
Year of birth missing (living people)